Paul Young is the CEO of Cartoon Saloon, a four-times nominated Academy award and BAFTA nominated Irish animation studio. He co-founded the studio in 1999 with Tomm Moore and Nora Twomey. Young is also a producer and an award-winning illustrator and cartoonist. In 2015 he was a finalist in the Ernst & Young Entrepreneur of the Year Award. He is on the board of Animation Ireland.

Education
Whilst travelling, having completed a degree in Art and Design at the University of Ulster, Young discovered he could make more money selling  caricatures to tourists on the beach than selling sandwiches and was inspired  to pursue animation as a career, enrolling on the animation degree course at  Ballyfermot College of Further Education in Dublin on his return. On the course Young met Tomm Moore and they co-founded Cartoon Saloon in 1999, after their graduation, along with Nora Twomey, fellow alumni.

Career
In the early days of Cartoon Saloon, the studio employed 12 animators and relied on commercial and corporate work including web-site design and CD ROM production with Young focusing on illustration whilst Tomm Moore undertook the animation. At that time the studio was searching for funding and according to Young “He found himself drawn toward the business side of the venture, mainly because his desk was next to the phone.”

In 2007 Paul Young was executive producer of Skunk Fu which went on to receive a BAFTA nomination in 2008 and to be distributed world-wide including to Cartoon Network and the BBC.
Young produced the Oscar-nominated animated feature films 2009’s The Secret of Kells, 2014’s Song of the Sea and 2020's  Wolfwalkers.

Accolades
 2008 BAFTA nomination for Skunk Fu
  2015 finalist in the Ernst & Young Entrepreneur of the Year Award.
 2021 Producers Guild of America Award nomination for Wolfwalkers

See also
Cartoon Saloon

References

External links

Irish illustrators
Irish cartoonists
Irish producers
Year of birth missing (living people)
Alumni of Ulster University
Living people